Juventus Football Club had one of its most successful seasons in the club's history, winning the domestic league competition and reaching the final of the Champions League. There, Juventus stumbled on Real Madrid by Predrag Mijatović' solitary goal, which ensured Juventus lost the final for the second year running. The progress to the final had been much less smooth than in the 1995–96 and 1996–97 European campaigns, prompting fears among supporters that the side was experiencing a decline. Indeed, on their way to the final in Amsterdam, the Italians had lost three games compared to none the previous season. They had needed to win their matchday six fixture against Manchester United to reach the quarter-final, where Dynamo Kyiv held them to a 1–1 draw in Turin in the first leg.

Alessandro Del Piero and Filippo Inzaghi, combined with French playmaker Zinedine Zidane, were the main reasons for Juventus' success. Rather than relying on the tight defence of 1996–97's league title, Juventus had two of the league's top scorers.

Players

Transfers

Winter

Competitions

Supercoppa Italiana

Serie A

League table

Results by round

Matches

Top Scorers
  Alessandro Del Piero 21 (3)
  Filippo Inzaghi 18
  Zinedine Zidane 7
  Daniel Fonseca 4
  Antonio Conte 4

UEFA Champions League

Group stage

Knockout phase

Quarter-finals

Semi-finals

Final

Coppa Italia

Round of 32

Round of 16

Quarterfinals

Semifinals

Statistics

Players statistics

References

Juventus F.C. seasons
Juventus
Italian football championship-winning seasons